Golf is a popular sport in Wales. Although the sport of golf in Great Britain is most associated with Scotland, where it was established and developed, Wales can record its first courses back to the 1880s, and today has over 200 clubs. The first amateur golf competition was held in 1895, and the first professional championship was in 1904. Wales has produced several players of note, including one player, Ian Woosnam, who has won one of the Men's major golf championships and Wales has twice won the men's World Cup, in 1987 and 2005, respectively. Wales also hosted the Ryder Cup, when it was held at Newport's Celtic Manor Resort in 2010.

History
The sport of golf in Wales traces its origins to the 1880s. The earliest course was constructed in Pontnewydd in Monmouthshire in 1875, but this was a short course. By the mid-1880s nine-hole courses were built at several sites in Wales on coastal common land where the turf was acceptable. Several sites claim to be home to the oldest golf club in Wales, though it is generally accepted that Tenby, formed in 1888, was the first, with evidence that the game was played there from at least 1875. Another early course is found stretching between Borth and Ynyslas being in use from 1885. Other 19th-century courses, again all coastal, include Conwy (1890), Penarth (1890), Porthcawl (1891) and Aberdyfi (1892). The opening of the early railway lines and the growing tourism in Wales gave these new courses opportunities to attract visitors. Though, as the golf clubs of Wales were initially created and run by the middle class, the sport suffered from a view as being English and elitist.

From its early days, Wales has embraced both male and female golfers. The Welsh Golfing Union was formed in 1895, the second oldest in the World behind its Irish counterpart; while the Welsh Ladies' Golf Union was founded in 1904. Wales Golf, which governs the sport in Wales, was founded in 2007 after the merger of the Welsh Ladies Golf Union and the Welsh Golfing Union.

Welsh golfers

Dai Rees was one of the first successful Welsh golfers, captaining a winning European Ryder Cup team in 1957. Wales has won the golfing World Cup on two occasions, with the pairing of David Llewellyn and Ian Woosnam lifting the trophy in Hawaii in 1987, and again in 2005, with Stephen Dodd and Bradley Dredge winning in Portugal.

Ian Woosnam is one of Wales' most notable players. Not only winning the 1987 World Cup, he is also the only Welshman to have won a major championship, when he took the 1991 Masters Tournament at Augusta. That year he also reached the number one spot on the Official World Golf Rankings, spending 50 weeks at the top of the rankings, only four golfers have held the title longer. Woosnam then followed countryman Rees' achievement when he led Europe to victory against the USA in the 2006 Ryder Cup.

Wales has supplied seven members of the British and European Ryder cup teams. The first was Bert Hodson, who played for Charles Whitcombe's 1931 team. Hodson played in only one round, losing to an in-form Denny Shute. Dai Rees played in three Ryder Cups, and his captaincy in 1957 was the only time the Americans were beaten between 1933 and 1985. Dave Thomas played in four Ryder Cups between 1959 and 1967, losing only one of his five singles matches. Brian Huggett played in six Ryder Cups and in 1977 was the sides non-player captain, the last time a British and Irish-only team contested the tournament. Woosnam played in eight consecutive teams, and in 2002 Phillip Price memorably beat Phil Mickelson in his singles match. 
Jamie Donaldson played in the 2014 Ryder Cup, beating Keegan Bradley 5 & 3 ensuring Europe won the Ryder Cup.

Meanwhile, Becky Brewerton played at the 2007 and 2009 Solheim Cup. She also finished third at the 2009 Ladies European Tour.

Tournaments in Wales
The first Welsh Amateur Championship in Wales was held in 1895 at Aberdovey Golf Club and then in 1901 the club became the first in Wales to host the British Ladies Amateur Golf Championship. The first professional golf championship was in Radyr near Cardiff in 1904 while the first Welsh Ladies' Amateur Championship was played in 1905. A Welsh team first competed in the Women's Home Internationals in 1907. In recent years Wales has held several annual golfing events, notably the Wales Challenge (founded in 2003), Wales Ladies Championship of Europe (1996) and the Wales Seniors Open (2001). Despite the heightened profile of golf in Wales generated by the Ryder Cup in 2010 all three tournaments were scrapped in 2011. The Wales Seniors Open is planned for a return in 2012 at Conwy Golf Course, while it has been announced that the 2014 Senior British Open Championship will be held at Royal Porthcawl Golf Club, the first time the event will be held in Wales. Royal Porthcawl is one of the most notable of Welsh courses and in the past has hosted the 1995 Walker Cup, The Amateur Championship on six occasions and the Wales Ladies Championship.

The Celtic Manor Resort in Newport, South Wales was the venue for the 2010 Ryder Cup; the first time the event was held in Wales. Europe beat the USA by 14½ points to 13½ in one of the most dramatic finishes to the tournament in recent years. The event also made history by becoming the first Ryder Cup to stretch over four days, following heavy rain throughout the weekend.

Courses
Wales is home to roughly 200 golf courses. The first appeared in the late 19th century, mainly links courses, most notably at Aberdyfi, Borth and Ynyslas, Conwy, Penarth, Porthcawl, St David's and Tenby. Cardiff's first club was at Radyr (1902), while other courses in Wales to appear that decade include those at Old Colwyn, Brecon and Porthmadog. Courses continued to appear in Wales throughout the early 20th century, including 14 designed by James Braid. In 1908, St David's Golf Club was granted Royal patronage by King Edward VII, becoming the first Welsh club to be granted the honour. Porthcawl became the second and last club in Wales to receive the title the following year.

Carmarthenshire

 Ashburnham Golf Club – Burry Port
 Carmarthen Golf Club – Carmarthen
 Derllys Court Golf Club – Carmarthen
 Garnant Park Golf Club – Ammanford
 Glynhir Golf Club – Ammanford
 Glyn Abbey Golf Club – Kidwelly
 Machynys Peninsula Golf & Country Club – Llanelli

Ceredigion

 Aberystwyth Golf Club – Aberystwyth
 Borth & Ynyslas Golf Club – Borth
 Cardigan Golf Club – Cardigan
 Cilgwyn Golf Club – Llangybi
 Penrhos Park Golf Club – Llanrhystud
 Cwmrhydneuadd Golf Club – Pentre-gat

Clwyd

 Abergele Golf Club - Abergele
 Bryn Morfydd Hotel Golf Club – Denbigh
 Caerwys Golf Club – Mold
 Chirk Golf & Country Club – Wrexham
 Clays Golf Club – Wrexham
 Denbigh Golf Club – Denbigh
 Flint Golf Club – Flint
 Hawarden Golf Club – Deeside
 Holywell Golf Club – Holywell
 Kinmel Park Golf Club – Rhyl
 Mold Golf Club – Mold -
 Moss Valley Golf Club – Wrexham
 Northop Country Park Golf Club – Chester
 Old Padeswood Golf Club – Mold
 Padeswood & Buckley Golf Club – Mold
 Prestatyn Golf Club – Prestatyn
 Rhuddlan Golf Club – Rhyl
 Rhyl Golf Club – Rhyl
 Ruthin Pwllglas Golf Club – Ruthin
 Saint Idloes Golf Club – Llanidloes
 Saint Melyd Golf Club – Prestatyn
 Silver Birch Golf Club – Betws-yn-Rhos
 Vale of Llangollen Golf Club – Llangollen
 Wrexham Golf Club – Wrexham

Glamorgan

 Aberdare Golf Club – Aberdare
 Allt-y-Graban Golf Club – Pontliw, Swansea
 Ashburnham Golf Club – Burry Port
 Bargoed Golf Club – Bargoed
 Bryn Meadows Golf Hotel – Hengoed
 Brynhill Golf Club – Barry
 Caerphilly Golf Club – Caerphilly
 Cardiff Golf Club – Cardiff
 Clyne Golf Club – Swansea
 Coed Y Mwstwr Golf Club – Bridgend
 Cottrell Park Golf Club – Cardiff
 Creigiau Golf Club – Cardiff
 Dinas Powis Golf Club – Dinas Powis
 Earlswood Golf Club – Neath
 Fairwood Park Golf Club – Swansea
 Glamorganshire Golf Club – Penarth
 Glyn Abbey Golf Club – Kidwelly
 Glynhir Golf Club – Ammanford
 Glynneath Golf Club – Glynneath
 Inco Golf Club – Swansea
 Langland Bay Golf Club – Swansea
 Llanishen Golf Club – Cardiff
 Llantrisant & Pontyclun Golf Club – Llantrisant
 Maesteg Golf Club – Maesteg
 Merthyr Tydfil Golf Club – Merthyr Tydfil
 Morlais Castle Golf Club – Merthyr Tydfil
 Morriston Golf Club – Swansea
 Mountain Ash Golf Club – Mountain Ash
 Mountain Lakes Golf Club – Caerphilly
 Neath Golf Club – Neath
 Palleg Golf Club – Swansea
 Pennard Golf Club – Swansea
 Peterstone Lakes Golf Club – Cardiff
 Pontardawe Golf Club – Swansea
 Pontypridd Golf Club – Pontypridd
 Pyle & Kenfig Golf Club – Bridgend
 Radyr Golf Club – Cardiff
 RAF Saint Athan Golf Club – St. Athan
 Rhondda Golf Club – Rhondda
 Royal Porthcawl Golf Club – Porthcawl
 Saint Andrews Major Golf Club – St. Andrews Major
 Saint Marys Golf Club – Bridgend
 Saint Mellons Golf Club – Cardiff
 Southerndown Golf Club – Bridgend
 Swansea Bay Golf Club – Neath
 Vale of Glamorgan Hotel Golf & Country Club – Cardiff
 Wenvoe Castle Golf Club -Wenvoe
 Whitchurch Golf Club – Cardiff
 Whitehall Golf Club – Treharris

Gwynedd

 Aberdovey Golf Club – Aberdyfi
 Abersoch Golf Club – Abersoch
 Betws y Coed Golf Club – Betws y Coed
 Conwy Golf Club – Conwy
 Criccieth Golf Club – Criccieth (closed)
 Dolgellau Golf Club – Dolgellau (closed)
 Llanfairfechan Golf Club – Llanfairfechan
 Maesdu Golf Club – Llandudno
 Nefyn & District Golf Club – Pwllheli
 North Wales Golf Club – Llandudno
 Penmaenmawr Golf Club – Penmaenmawr
 Porthmadog Golf Club – Porthmadog
 Pwllheli Golf Club – Pwllheli
 Rhos-on-Sea Golf Club – Rhos-on-Sea
 Royal Saint Davids Golf Club – Harlech
 Royal Town of Caernarfon Golf Club – Caernarfon
 Saint Deiniol Golf Club – Bangor
 Tyddyn Mawr Golf Course – Caernarfon

Isle of Anglesey

 Anglesey Golf Club – Rhosneigr
 Baron Hill Golf Club – Bangor
 Bull Bay Golf Club – Amlwch
 Henllys Golf Club – Beaumaris
 Holyhead Golf Club – Holyhead
 Llangefni Golf Club – Llangefni
 Storws Wen Golf Club – Brynteg

Monmouthshire

 Alice Springs Golf Club – Usk
 Blackwood Golf Club – Blackwood
 Caerleon Golf Club – Caerleon
 Celtic Manor Hotel & Country Club – Newport
 Cwmbran Municipal Golf Club – Cwmbran
 Dewstow Golf Club – Caldicot
 Green Meadow Golf Club – Cwmbran
 Llanwern Golf Club – Llanwern
 Monmouth Golf Club – Monmouth
 Monmouthshire Golf Club – Abergavenny
 Newport Golf Club – Newport
 Oakdale Golf Club – Oakdale
 Pontnewydd Golf Club – Cwmbran
 Pontypool Golf Club – Pontypool
 Raglan Parc Golf Club – Raglan
 St Pierre Hotel and Country Club – Chepstow
 Shirenewton Golf Club – Chepstow
 The Rolls of Monmouth Golf Club – Monmouth
 Tredegar & Rhymney Golf Club – Tredegar
 Tredegar Park Golf Club – Newport
 Wernddu Golf Club – Abergavenny
 West Monmouthshire Golf Club – Nantyglo
 Woodlake Park Golf Club – Pontypool

Pembrokeshire

 Dawn Till Dusk Golf Club – Rosemarket
 Haverfordwest Golf Club – Haverfordwest
 Herons Brook Golf Course – Narberth
 Mayfield Golf Club – Haverfordwest
 Milford Haven Golf Club – Milford Haven
 Priskilly Forest Golf Club – Castlemorris
 St. Davids City Golf Club – St. Davids
 South Pembrokeshire Golf Club – Pembroke Dock
 Tenby Golf Club – Tenby
 Trefloyne Golf Course – Tenby

Powys

 Bala Golf Club – Bala
 Brecon Golf Club – Brecon
 Builth Wells Golf Club – Builth Wells
 Club Bala Lake Hotel Golf Club – Bala
 Cradoc Golf Club – Brecon
 Knighton Golf Club – Knighton
 Llandrindod Golf Club – Builth Wells
 Llanymynech Golf Club – Llanymynech
 Machynlleth Golf Club – Machynlleth
 Rhosgoch Golf Club – Builth Wells
 Saint Giles Newtown Golf Club – Newtown
 Welsh Border Golf Complex – Middletown
 Welshpool Golf Club – Welshpool

References